This is a detailed discography for American singer songwriter Dan Fogelberg.

Albums

Solo studio albums

Studio albums with Tim Weisberg

Live albums

Compilation albums

Singles

Other charted songs

References

Discographies of American artists
Folk music discographies